Argari is a census town in Sankrail CD Block of Howrah Sadar subdivision in Howrah district in the Indian state of West Bengal. It is a part of Kolkata Urban Agglomeration.

Geography
It is situated between Andul and Alampur.

Demographics

As per 2011 Census of India Argari had a total population of 10,715 of which 5,555 (52%) were males and 5,160 (48%) were females. Population below 6 years was 1,217. The total number of literates in Argari was 8,156 (85.87% of the population over 6 years).

Argari was part of Kolkata Urban Agglomeration in 2011 census.

 India census, Argari had a population of 9525. Males constitute 52% of the population and females 48%. Argari has an average literacy rate of 66%, higher than the national average of 59.5%; with 54% of the males and 46% of females literate. 13% of the population is under 6 years of age.

Transport
Andul Road (part of Grand Trunk Road/State Highway 6) is the artery of the town.

Bus

Private Bus
 61 Alampur - Howrah Station

Mini Bus
 13 Ranihati - Rajabazar
 13A Fatikgachi - Rajabazar
 20 Alampur - Ultadanga Station

Bus Routes Without Numbers
 Mourigram railway station - Barrackpur Cantonment

Train
Andul railway station and Mourigram railway station on Howrah-Kharagpur line are the nearest railway stations of Argari.

References

Cities and towns in Howrah district
Neighbourhoods in Kolkata
Kolkata Metropolitan Area